Charlie McGlade was a volunteer in the Irish Republican Army (IRA) and later member of the member of Sinn Féin Ard Chomhairle (executive committee).

Originally from Belfast (and later moving to Drimnagh in Dublin), McGlade joined the IRA in the late 1920s. In the late 1930s, McGlade was responsible for the creation of the IRAs Northern Command. He was arrested several times for IRA activities and (in 1936) received a two year sentenced at hard labor. McGlade was involved in the planning of the 1939-40 sabotage/ bombing attack on British soil - the S-Plan In June 1941 McGlade arrested Stephen Hayes who was accused of being a spy for the Irish Free State government. 

In the early 1940s was shot and wounded by Special Branch Gardaí in Dublin. McGlade's shooting was one of the justifications given by the IRA for the killing of Special Branch Sergeant Denis O'Brien (9 September 1942). Charlie Kerins was charged with the killing of Sergeant O'Brien. Kerins refused to recognize the authority of the court and was found guilty and hung in Mountjoy Prison on 1 December 1944.

Following this incident, McGlade was imprisoned until the conclusion of the Second World War. Upon his release he re-involved himself in republican activism, eventually siding with the Provisional IRA in the 1969 split in the IRA.

References

Irish Republican Army (1922–1969) members
Year of birth missing